Fais pas ci, fais pas ça (English translation: Don't do this, don't do that) is a French television series created by Anne Giafferi and Thierry Bizot. The series debuted on September 8, 2007, on France 2.

Cast

Main characters

Supporting characters

Guest actors
 Anne Benoît as Andrée (2 episodes)
 Arielle Dombasle as Herself (1 episode)
 Arnaud Ducret as Michel (1 episode)
 Catherine Benguigui as The ANPE employee (1 episode)
 Charlie Dupont as Loïc Leguédec (2 episodes)
 Émilie Gavois-Kahn as Mika (1 episode)
 Helena Noguerra as Child psychiatrist (3 episodes)
 Lannick Gautry as Benoit (1 episode)
 Lionel Abelanski as The gynecologist (1 episode)
 Marie-Christine Adam as The owner (1 episode)
 Marie-Hélène Lentini as Madame Descato (2 episodes)
 Michaël Abiteboul as Pedro (1 episode)
 Naveen Polishetty as Rushik Sanghvi (2 episodes)
 Jean-Baptiste Shelmerdine as Olaf (1 episode)
 Philippe Nahon as Gérard (1 episode)
 Sophie Mounicot as Madame Didier (1 episode)
 Sylvie Testud as Sylviane Chinsky (1 episode)

Media adaptations
The TV show was adapted into a comic book by Philippe Bercovici and Dal.

References

External links
  
 

France Télévisions television comedy
2000s French comedy television series
2010s French comedy television series
2007 French television series debuts
French-language television shows
Television shows set in France
Television shows adapted into comics